is a Japanese manga series written and illustrated by Fujio Akatsuka, which began publication on April 9, 1967, in Weekly Shōnen Magazine. It is about the misadventures of a dim-witted boy (Bakabon) and his idiotic father, the latter of whom eventually becomes the central character.

It has been adapted into five anime television series. The first two series produced by Tokyo Movie were broadcast in the 1970s for 40 and 103 episodes respectively. The third and fourth series were produced by Pierrot and broadcast in 1990 and 1999–2000, for 46 and 24 episodes respectively. The fifth series was produced by Pierrot+ and broadcast for 12 episodes in 2018.

Characters

Bakabon's troublemaker father who eventually steals the show and becomes the central character. His catchphrase is saying "" to someone when trying to get them to go along with one of his stupid plans. A typical episode plot involves Papa either being too stupid to perform a simple task or coming up with some crazy idea to accomplish a simple task, usually asking for his son Bakabon's advice and causing tons of trouble. He was once very smart but became an idiot after an accident. He is known for always wearing his trademark hachimaki and haramaki. His favorite food is octopus. Papa has become an anime icon in Japan and was ranked number 9 in a 2002 TV Asahi Top 100 Anime Characters list. Voiced by Masashi Amenomori (1st-2nd series), Kōsei Tomita (3rd series, pachinko games), Hisahiro Ogura (4th series), Arata Furuta (5th series). 

A boy who enjoys causing mischief, especially with his Papa. On the inside, though, he is kind and works a part-time job as a shoeshine boy to buy his mother a birthday present. He is known for not wearing pants underneath his kimono. At the beginning of the series he attends , which means Idiot Elementary School, but by the fourth anime it has been renamed , meaning Stupid Elementary School. Voiced by Keiko Yamamoto (1st-2nd series, pachinko), Megumi Hayashibara (3rd series), Yoshiko Kamei (4th series), Miyu Irino (5th series). 

Bakabon's younger brother. He is a child prodigy, understanding words almost immediately after his birth and being capable of explaining the Pythagorean theorem and Kepler's laws of planetary motion. His name means "beginning". Voiced by Takako Sasuga (1st-2nd series, pachinko), Chika Sakamoto (3rd series), Yukiji (4th series), Ai Nonaka (5th series).

Despite how much trouble and mischief Papa and Bakabon cause, she is a good wife and mother. She is the only family member to have the same voice actress throughout the series. Voiced by Eiko Masuyama (1st-4th series), Haruko Kitahama (1st series, Ep. 35 only), Noriko Hidaka (5th series).

The Bakabon family's odd neighbor, named so for his tendency to say "rerere" (rather than ) when confused about the countless shenanigans in the series. He is almost always seen sweeping the street outside of his yard. He is bald, has a moustache but no nose, ears that extend slightly off of his head, and wears a yukata and geta sandals. Voiced by Ryūji Saikachi (1st-2nd series), Shigeru Chiba (3rd-4th series, pachinko), Akira Ishida (5th series).

He is gluttonous, lecherous, and often fires his pistol at random. He is always wishing for money or a promotion. His notable features include his huge eyes usually drawn as connected into one eyeball, his underbite buck teeth (from the jawbone), and his one nostril in the middle of his nose. Voiced by Isamu Tanonaka (1st series), Kaneta Kimotsuki (2nd series), Shigeru Chiba (3rd-4th series, pachinko), Toshiyuki Morikawa (5th anime).

An unusual animal from the neighborhood who is a cross between an eel and a dog. Voiced by Michihiro Ikemizu (2nd series), Aruno Tahara (3rd series), Kōzō Shioya (4th series), Takahiro Sakurai (5th anime).

A goofy dog who shows up during scene changes.

Bakabon's classmate who always wears a helmet. For the 4th anime he was renamed . Voiced by Rica Matsumoto (3rd series), Kappei Yamaguchi (4th series).

A reckless horse with no owner.

Minor characters

Bakabon's headmaster. Only appears in the first anime. Voiced by Kōichi Kitamura.

Bakabon's ill-tempered classmate. Only appears in the first anime. Voiced by Kaneta Kimotsuki.

Characters from Akatsuka's other Titles

Originally from Osomatsu-kun, he only appears in the Rerere no Tensai Bakabon series alongside Chibita. Voiced by Kaneta Kimotsuki (Episodes 1, 4, 16); Kenichi Ogata (Episodes 3, 6, 11, 16, 20-21, 24) (4th series)

Originally from Osomatsu-kun, he only appears in the Rerere no Tensai Bakabon series alongside Iyami.

Originally from Osomatsu-kun, he only appears in the Rerere no Tensai Bakabon series.

Originally from Osomatsu-kun, he only appears in the Rerere no Tensai Bakabon series.

Originally from Osomatsu-kun, he only appears in the Rerere no Tensai Bakabon series.

Originally from Kikanpo Gen-chan. Bakabon's girlfriend. Only appears in the first anime. Voiced by Kazuko Sawada.

Media

Manga
4 bilingual Japanese-English volumes have been released of the manga as The Genius Bakabon.

Anime
Four anime series have been produced, with the first two series produced by Tokyo Movie Shinsha and the second two produced by Studio Pierrot.  aired for 40 episodes on Yomiuri TV from September 25, 1971, to June 24, 1972. Three years later,  aired for 103 episodes on NTV from October 6, 1975, to September 26, 1977.

The two Studio Pierrot series aired nearly nine years apart, with  airing on Fuji TV for 46 episodes from January 6 to December 29, 1990, and  airing on TV Tokyo from October 19, 1999, to March 21, 2000, for 24 episodes. In India this show was broadcast by Hungama TV. A late night anime titled  premiered on July 10, 2018 on TV Tokyo and other channels. It ran for 12 episodes.

Notes

References

External links
 Heisei Tensai Bakabon, Studio Pierrot
 Heisei Tensai Bakabon , Studio Pierrot (Japanese)
 
 

1967 manga
1971 anime television series debuts
1975 anime television series debuts
1990 anime television series debuts
1999 anime television series debuts
Comedy anime and manga
Fuji TV original programming
Fujio Akatsuka
Gag-a-day comics
Kodansha manga
Nippon TV original programming
Pierrot (company)
Studio Signpost
Shogakukan manga
Shōnen manga
TMS Entertainment
TV Tokyo original programming
Yomiuri Telecasting Corporation original programming